Good, Bad & Pretty Things is the third studio album by Canadian country music artist Jessie Farrell. It was released on October 6, 2009, by 604. The album's first single is "You Make Me Feel".

Track listing

Personnel
Eddie Bayers - drums, percussion
Bruce Bouton - lap steel guitar, pedal steel guitar
Gary Burr - acoustic guitar, resonator guitar
Jessie Farrell - lead vocals, background vocals
Kevin Haynie - banjo
Brent Mason - electric guitar
Michael Rhodes - bass guitar
Mike Rojas - accordion, Hammond B-3 organ, keyboards
Jonathan Yudkin - fiddle, mandolin

2009 albums
604 Records albums
Jessie Farrell albums